Tianshan District is one of 7 urban districts of the prefecture-level city of Ürümqi, the capital of Xinjiang Uygur Autonomous Region, Northwest China. It is a core urban district of Ürümqi. According to the 2002 census, it has a population of 450,000.

County-level divisions of Xinjiang
Ürümqi